The 1984 NCAA Women's Lacrosse Championship was the third annual single-elimination tournament to determine the national championship of NCAA women's college lacrosse. The championship game was played at Nickerson Field in Boston, Massachusetts during May 1984. 

The Temple Owls won their first championship after defeating the Maryland Terrapins in the final, 6–4. 

The leading scorer for the tournament, for the second straight year, was Karen Emas, from Delaware, with 20 goals. Marie Schmucker, from Temple, was named the Most Outstanding Player of the tournament.

Qualification 
Until 1985, there was only one NCAA championship; a Division III title was added in 1985 and a Division II title in 2001. Hence, all NCAA women's lacrosse programs were eligible for this championship. This tournament, in turn, was contested by 12 teams.

Tournament bracket

Tournament outstanding players 
Karen Emas, Delaware
Missy Meharg, Delaware
Linda Schmidt, Delaware
Celine Flynn, Maryland
Andrea Lemire, Maryland
Mary Lynne Morgan, Maryland
Kay Ruffino, Maryland
Tracy Stumpf, Maryland
Carol Progulski, Massachusetts
Barbara Bielicki, Temple
Marie Schmucker, Temple (Most Outstanding Player)
Carol Schultz, Temple

See also 
 NCAA Division I Women's Lacrosse Championship
 1984 NCAA Division I Men's Lacrosse Championship

References

NCAA Division I Women's Lacrosse Championship
NCAA Division I Women's Lacrosse Championship
NCAA Women's Lacrosse Championship